Hinduism is the second largest religious affiliation in People's Republic of Bangladesh, as according to the Official 2022 Census of Bangladesh, approximately 13.1 million people responded that they were Hindus, constituting 7.95% out of the total population of 165.15 million people. In terms of population, Bangladesh is the third-largest Hindu populated country of the world, just after India and Nepal. Hinduism is the second-largest religion in 61 out of 64 districts of Bangladesh, but there is no Hindu majority district in Bangladesh.

Culture 
In nature, Bangladeshi Hinduism closely resembles the forms and customs of Hinduism practiced in the neighboring Indian state of West Bengal, with which Bangladesh (at one time known as East Bengal) was united until the partition of India in 1947. The vast majority of Hindus in Bangladesh are Bengali Hindus.

Goddess (Devi) – usually venerated as Durga or Kali – is widely revered, often alongside her consort Shiva. The worship of Shiva has generally found adherents among the higher castes in Bangladesh. Worship of Vishnu (typically in the form of his Avatars or incarnation Rama or Krishna) more explicitly cuts across caste lines by teaching the fundamental oneness of humankind in spirit. Vishnu worship in Bengal expresses the union of the male and female principles in a tradition of love and devotion. This form of Hindu belief and the Sufi tradition of Islam have influenced and interacted with each other in Bengal. Both were popular mystical movements emphasizing the personal relationship of religious leaders and disciples instead of the dry stereotypes of the Brahmins or the Ulama. As in Bengali Islamic practice, worship of Vishnu frequently occurs in a small devotional society (shomaj). Both use the language of earthly love to express communion with the divine. In both traditions, the Bengali language is the vehicle of a large corpus of mystical literature of great beauty and emotional impact.

In Bangladeshi Hinduism ritual bathing, vows, and pilgrimages to sacred rivers, mountains, and shrines are common practices. An ordinary Hindu will worship at the shrines of Muslim pirs, without being concerned with the religion to which that place is supposed to be affiliated. Hindus revere many holy men and ascetics conspicuous for their bodily mortifications. Some believe that they attain spiritual benefit merely by looking at a great holy man. Durga Puja, held in September–October, is the most important festival of Bangladeshi Hindus and it is widely celebrated across Bangladesh. Thousands of pandals (mandaps) are set up in various cities, towns, and villages to mark the festival. Other festivals are Kali Puja, Janmashtami, Holi, Saraswati Puja, Shivratri and Rathayatra, the most popular being the century-old Dhamrai Rathayatra.

The principle of ahimsa is expressed in almost universally observed rules against eating beef. By no means are all Bangladeshi Hindus vegetarians, but abstinence from all kinds of meat is regarded as a "higher" virtue. The Priestly Caste Brahmin (pronounced Brahmon in Bengali) Bangladeshi Hindus, unlike their counterparts elsewhere in South Asia, eat fish and chicken. This is similar to the Indian state of West Bengal, where Hindus also consume fish, eggs, chicken, and mutton. There are also some vegetarians as well. There are also non-Bengali Hindus in Bangladesh, majority of the Hajong, Rajbongshi people and Tripuris in Bangladesh are Hindus.

Demographics

Source: Census of India 1901-1941, Census of East Pakistan 1951-1961, Bangladesh Government Census 1974-2022According to the 2001 Bangladesh census, there were around 11.82 million Hindus in Bangladesh constituting 9.6% of the population, which at the time was 123.15 million. The Bangladesh 2011 census states, that approximately 12.73 million people responded that they were Hindus, constituting 8.54% of the total 149.77 million. While 2022 Census of Bangladesh, put the number of Hindus in Bangladesh at 13.1 million out of total 165.1 million population, thus constituting 7.95% of the population. According to a report published by a local daily newspaper of Bangladesh, the Hindu population in the country has reduced by nearly one million between 2001 and 2011 period. The reduction mainly happened in nine districts – Bhola, Barisal, Jhalokati, Pirojpur, Bagerhat, Narail, Gopalganj, Rajbari and Manikganj. The United States Commission on International Religious Freedom have said that Hindus constitute merely 7% of the population in Bangladesh as per as the latest 2016 figures. Hindus in Bangladesh in the late 2000s were almost evenly distributed in all regions, with large concentrations in Gopalganj, Dinajpur, Sylhet, Sunamganj, Mymensingh, Khulna, Jessore, Chittagong and parts of Chittagong Hill Tracts. In the capital city of Dhaka, Hindus are the second-largest religious community after the Muslims and the largest concentration of Hindus can be found in and around Shankhari Bazaar of the old city.

In 2013, Amnesty International reported that the rise of more explicitly Islamist political formations in Bangladesh during the 1990s had resulted in many Hindus being intimidated or attacked, and that fairly substantial numbers were leaving the country for India.

In 1901, Hindus constituted 33% of the population of what is now Bangladesh. In 1941, about 28% of the population were Hindus. Their proportion declined to 22% in 1951 after the Partition of India in 1947, as Hindus migrated from East Bengal to India. Wealthy Hindus who migrated lost their land and assets through the East Bengal Evacuees Act. Poor and middle-class Hindus who were left behind were targets of discriminatory new laws. At the outbreak of the 1965 India-Pakistan war, the Defense of Pakistan Ordinance, and later the Enemy (Custody and Registration) Order II, labeled Hindus as the "enemy" and expropriated their property. The 1974 census of Bangladesh showed that the population of Hindus had fallen to 13.5%. Even after independence, the Hindus were branded "Indian stooges" and untrustworthy citizens.

Since 1971, the Hindu percentage has continued to decline, forming 8.5% of the population as of 2011. The fall in the share of total population has been attributed to outward migration, and the fertility rate for Hindus remaining consistently lower than Muslims (2.1 versus 2.3 as of 2014).

Hindu population by administrative divisions

According to the Bangladesh Bureau of Statistics report, Khulna division has the highest decline in Hindu population of (1.33%) from 2011-22 period. In 2011, 12.85% of the population of the division were Hindus. This rate has come down to 11.52% in 2022. Among the eight divisions, Khulna has the third highest Hindu population. According to the 2022 census, Sylhet division has the highest Hindu population of 13.5%, but the ratio was 14.05% in 2011. In Rangpur division, the Hindu population has decreased from 13.21% in 2011 to 12.98% in 2022. Mymensingh division has the lowest percentage of people belonging to the Hindu community at (3.92%) as of 2022.

Hinduism in Bangladesh by decades

The Hindu population in what is now Bangladesh has decreased as a percentage of the total population, from 28% in 1941 to a mere 7.9% in 2022. After the emergence of Bangladesh, the Hindu community continued to decline as a percentage of the population—from 13.5% in 1974 to 7.9% in 2022. Bangladesh Census authority have found that since from the last 50 years, about 7.5 million (75 lakhs) hindus have left the country due to religious persecution and discrimination. As per as 2016 official figures, it is estimated that Hindu population have came down to a mere 7%.

Projections

Future population 
From 1964 to 2013, around 11.3 million Hindus left Bangladesh due to religious persecution and discrimination, as stated by Dhaka university economist Abul Barkat. On average 632 Hindus left the country each day and 230,612 annually as reported by him.
From his 30-year-long research, Barkat found that the exodus mostly took place during military governments after independence. Barkat also state's: that there should have been 28.7 million Hindus in the year 2013 instead of 12.2 million", Or, to put it another way, Hindus should accounted for 16-18% of Bangladesh's population, not 9.7% as they do currently. According to the United States Commission on International Religious Freedom, Hindus constitute merely 7% of the population in Bangladesh as per as the latest 2016 figures.

According to the Pew Research Center, Bangladesh will have 14.47 million Hindus by 2050 and will comprise 7.3% of the country's population. Another theory suggest that Bangladesh will have at least 230-250 million population by 2050, out of which there will be around 8.51-9.25 million hindus living in this nation, thus constituting only 3.7% after the beginning of half-century.
On average, annually 230,612 Hindus were leaving Bangladesh for India permanently. So between (2011-2051), It is estimated that 9,224,480 Hindus will leave the country if current immigration on this rate continues further.

Missing population
With migration into West Bengal, the 1947 partition of Bengal significantly altered religious demographics in the eastern segment of the province, which later became Bangladesh. Violence also saw an uptick in the 1950s and 1960s in what had then become East Pakistan (present-day-Bangladesh), leading to large numbers of upper caste Bengali Hindus migrating to West Bengal, Assam and Tripura with official Indian Government records indicating 4.12 million (Hindu) refugees crossed into India from East Bengal between 1947 and 1958.

Utilizing demographic studies and other methods over a 55-year period from 1947 to 2001, professor Sachi Dastidar of the State University of New York calculates that well over 49 million Hindus are missing today from Bangladesh. Ergo in the absence of partition in 1947 and other events that followed, it is estimated the present-day Bangladeshi hindu population would be approximately 62.73 million or 31.4%, well above the current population of 12.73 million or 8.5%, as reported in the Bangladesh 2011 census.

According to a report published by a local daily newspaper of Bangladesh, the Hindu population in the country has reduced by 1 million between 2001 and 2011 period. After the 1960s, most of the migration was lower caste – a trend that has continued to till this day. As per a BJP estimate, Bangladeshi Hindu immigrants are a significant presence in 75 Assembly constituencies – making up approximately a fourth of the state's seats. 

Starting from the 2014 Lok Sabha elections, the BJP has made the issue of Hindu Bangladeshi immigrants a core part of its strategy in West Bengal. An estimation shows that around 30 million Bangladeshi origin low-caste Hindu refugees live in different parts of West Bengal specially in southern districts namely North 24 Parganas, South 24 Parganas, Nadia and other smaller pockets of North and South Bengal, they are having an influence in over 70 assembly constituencies and are eagerly waiting to acquire Indian citizenship through CAA which was passed by Indian parliament in 2019 year for the purpose of granting them citizenship (if their religion is Hinduism, Sikhism, Jainism) as a promise criteria made by BJP in the election campaign of West Bengal earlier before the passage of that bill. An estimation shows that Assam has around 2 million Bangladeshi Hindus living in different parts of the state and are struggling to acquire Indian citizenship just like their counterparts in neighbouring West Bengal. The BJP hopes to wean away a large chunk of Bengali settlers who took refuge in Tripura from Bangladesh (former East Pakistan). The influx of the Bengali Hindus increased during the Bangladesh Liberation War and around at that time of (1971), India have received 10 million refugees from East Pakistan- mostly 80% being Hindus, and after Bangladesh become independent, nearly 1.5 million of Bengali Hindu refugees decided to stay back in India particularly in West Bengal and other North Eastern states majorly in Assam and Tripura. Census data show the population of Tripura's 19 Scheduled Tribes dropped from 63.77% in 1881 to 31.78% in 2011. This is attributed to the migration of 6.10 lakh Bengalis – the figure almost equal to the State's total population in 1951 – from East Pakistan (now Bangladesh) between 1947 and 1971. At present, there are around 2.2 million Bengali Hindus in Tripura (moslty having Eastern Bangladeshi origin), making them the largest ethnic group in the State, constituting around 60 per cent of the state population.

Population controversies
The official number of Hindus living in Bangladesh is about 13.1 million or say 7.9% as per as 2022 census conducted by Bangladesh government authority. However, at certain times different leaders as well as Bangladesh Bureau of Statistics have given different estimates. Bangladesh Institute of Development Studies (BIDS) have found that 4.67 million people, which is about 2.75% of country's total population, were have not been counted by the Bangladesh Bureau of Statistics (BBS) for 2022 census. Moreover, around 2.75% of undercount was reported in the case of Muslims against 2.68% of followers of other religions. At the same time, Indigenous activists of Bangladesh have claimed that Ethnic minorities have been undercounted in Bangladesh's latest census.

Hindu Temples

Hindu temples and shrines are more or less distributed all across the country. The Kantaji Temple is an elegant example of an 18th-century temple. The most important temple in terms of prominence is the Dhakeshwari National Temple, located in Dhaka. This temple along with other Hindu organizations arranges Durga Puja and Krishna Janmaashtami very prominently. The other main temples of Dhaka are the Ramakrishna Mission, Ramna Kali Temple, Joy Kali Temple, Laxmi Narayan Mandir, Swami Bagh Temple and Siddheswari Kalimandir.

Many Hindu temples have suffered from the implementation of the Vested Property Act through which land and moveable property has been confiscated by agents acting on behalf of successive governments.

Hindu marriage law

Hindu family law governs the personal life of Hindus in Bangladesh. There is no known limit for the number of wives a Hindu man can take in Bangladesh so polygamy for Hindu man is legal in Bangladesh.

"Under Bangladesh Hindu (civil) law, men may have multiple wives, but there are officially no options for divorce," the report said.

Women are also prohibited from inheriting property under the civil laws for Hindus, the report said.

A survey conducted during the year by Research Initiatives in Bangladesh and MJF showed that 26.7 percent of Hindu men and 29.2 percent of Hindu women would like to obtain a divorce but did not do so because of existing laws.

Community issues
The Hindu community has many similar issues as the predominantly Muslim community of Bangladesh. These include women's rights, dowry, poverty, unemployment, and others. Issues unique to the Hindu community include maintenance of Hindu culture and temples in Bangladesh. Small sects of Islamists constantly try to politically and socially isolate the Hindus of Bangladesh. Because Hindus of Bangladesh are scattered across all areas (except in Narayanganj), they cannot unite politically. However, Hindus became sway voters in various elections. Hindus have usually voted in large mass for Bangladesh Awami League and communist parties, as these are the only parties which have a nominal commitment to secularism; the alternatives are the increasingly pro-Islamist centrist parties such as the Bangladesh Nationalist Party and Jatiya Party (which both incorporate Muslim identity into their version of Bangladeshi nationalism) or the outright Islamist Jamaat-e-Islami Bangladesh (an offshoot of the Pakistan-based Jamaat-e-Islami) which seeks to establish Islamic law under which there would be separate provisions for Hindus as non-Muslims. However, Hindus, in general, maintain cordial relationships with liberal Muslims and they even participate in each other's festivals such as Durga Puja and Eid al-Fitr.

Bangladesh Liberation War atrocities (1971)

The Bangladesh Liberation War resulted in one of the largest genocides of the 20th century. While estimates of the number of casualties were 200,000–3,000,000, it is reasonably certain that Hindus bore a disproportionate brunt of the Pakistan Army's onslaught against the Bengali population of what was East Pakistan. The Pakistani Army killed many Bengali Hindus during the Liberation War, and most of the Bengali Hindu-owned businesses were permanently destroyed. The historic Ramna Kali Temple in Dhaka and the century-old Rath at Dhamrai were demolished and burned down by the Pakistani Army.

The initial post-independence period (1972–75) 
In the first constitution of the newly independent country, secularism and equality of all citizens irrespective of religious identity were enshrined. On his return to liberated Bangladesh, Sheikh Mujibur Rahman in his first speech to the nation, specifically recognized the disproportionate suffering of the Hindu population during the Bangladesh Liberation War. On a visit to Kolkata, India in February 1972, Mujib visited the refugee camps that were still hosting several million Bangladeshi Hindus and appealed to them to return to Bangladesh and to help to rebuild the country.

Despite the public commitment of Sheikh Mujibur Rahman and his government to re-establishing secularism and the rights of non-Muslim religious groups, two significant aspects of his rule remain controversial as relates to the conditions of Hindus in Bangladesh. The first was his refusal to return the premises of the Ramna Kali Mandir, historically the most important temple in Dhaka, to the religious body that owned the property. This centuries-old Hindu temple was demolished by the Pakistan army during the Bangladesh Liberation War, and around one hundred devotees were murdered. Under the provisions of the Enemy Property Act, it was determined that ownership of the property could not be established as there were no surviving members to claim inherited rights, and the land was handed over to the Dhaka Club.

Secondly, state-authorized confiscation of Hindu owned property under the provisions of the Enemy Property Act was rampant during Mujib's rule, and as per the research conducted by Abul Barkat of Dhaka University, the Awami League party of Sheikh Mujib was the largest beneficiary of Hindu property transfer in the past 35 years of Bangladeshi independence. This was enabled considerably because of the particular turmoil and displacement suffered by Bangladeshi Hindus, who bore the disproportionate burnt of the Pakistan army's genocide, as well documented by international publications such as Time magazine and the New York Times, and by the declassified Hamoodur Rahman Commission report. This caused much bitterness among Bangladeshi Hindus, particularly given the public stance of the regime's commitment to secularism and communal harmony.

Zia and Ershad regimes (1975–1990)
President Ziaur Rahman abandoned the constitutional provision for secularism and began to introduce Islamic symbolism in all spheres of national life (such as official seals and the constitutional preamble). Zia brought back the multi-party system thus allowing organizations such as Jamaat-e-Islami Bangladesh (an offshoot of the Islamist Jamaat-e-Islami in Pakistan) to regroup and contest elections.

In 1988 President Hussein Mohammed Ershad declared Islam to be the State Religion of Bangladesh. Though the move was protested by students and left-leaning political parties and minority groups, to this date neither the regimes of the BNP or Awami League has challenged this change and it remains in place.

In 1990, the Ershad regime was widely blamed for negligence (and some human rights analysis allege active participation) in the anti-Hindu riots following the Babri Mosque incident in India, the largest communal disturbances since Bangladesh independence, as a means of diverting attention from the rapidly increasing opposition to his rule. Many Hindu temples, Hindu neighbourhoods and shops were attacked and damaged including, for the first time since 1971, the Dhakeshwari temple. The atrocities were brought to the West's attention by many Bangladeshis, including Taslima Nasrin and her book Lajja which translated into English means "shame".

Return to democracy (1991–2008)

Immediately after the Bangladesh Nationalist Party and its Islamic fundamentalist allies came to power in the October 2001 elections, ruling coalition activists attacked Hindus on a large scale in retribution for their perceived support of the opposition Awami League. Hundreds were killed, many were raped, and thousands fled to India. The events were widely seen as a repercussion against the razing of the Babri Mosque in India.

Prominent political leaders frequently fall back on "Hindu bashing" in an attempt to appeal to extremist sentiment and to stir up communal passions. In one of the most notorious utterances of a mainstream Bangladeshi figure, the immediate past Prime Minister Khaleda Zia, while the leader of the opposition in 1996, declared that the country was at risk of hearing "uludhhwani" (a Hindu custom involving women's ululation) from mosques, replacing the azan (Muslim call to prayer) (e.g., see Agence-France Press report of 18 November 1996, "Bangladesh opposition leader accused of hurting religious sentiment").

After the election of 2001, when a right-wing coalition including two Islamist parties (Jamaat-e-Islami Bangladesh and Islami Oikya Jote) led by the pro-Islamic right wing Bangladesh Nationalist Party (BNP) came to power, many minority Hindus and liberal secularist Muslims were attacked by a section of the governing regime. Thousands of Bangladeshi Hindus were believed to have fled to neighbouring India to escape the violence unleashed by activists sympathetic to the new government. Many Bangladeshi Muslims played an active role in documenting atrocities against Hindus during this period.

The new government also clamped down on attempts by the media to document alleged atrocities against non-Muslim minorities following the election. Severe pressure was put on newspapers and other media outside of government control through threats of violence and other intimidation. Most prominently, the Muslim journalist and human rights activist Shahriyar Kabir was arrested on charges of treason on his return from India where he had been interviewing Hindu refugees from Bangladesh; this was by the Bangladesh High Court and he was subsequently freed.

The fundamentalists and right-wing parties such as the BNP and Jatiya Party often portray Hindus as being sympathetic to India, and transferring economic resources to India, contributing to a widespread perception that Bangladeshi Hindus are disloyal to the state. Also, the right-wing parties claim the Hindus to be backing the Awami League.
As widely documented in international media, Bangladesh authorities have had to increase security to enable Bangladeshi Hindus to worship freely following widespread attacks on places of worship and devotees.

After bombings in Bangladesh by the Islamic fundamentalists, the government has taken steps to strengthen the security during various minority celebrations, especially during Durga Puja and Rathayatra.

In October 2006, the United States Commission on International Religious Freedom published a report titled 'Policy Focus on Bangladesh,' which said that since its last election, 'Bangladesh has experienced growing violence by religious extremists, intensifying concerns expressed by the country's religious minorities'. The report further stated that Hindus are particularly vulnerable in a period of rising violence and extremism, whether motivated by religious, political or criminal factors, or some combination. The report noted that Hindus had multiple disadvantages against them in Bangladesh, such as perceptions of dual loyalty concerning India and religious beliefs that are not tolerated by the politically dominant Islamic Fundamentalists of the BNP. Violence against Hindus has taken place "in order to encourage them to flee in order to seize their property". The previous reports of the Hindu American Foundation were acknowledged and confirmed by this non-partisan report.

On 2 November 2006, USCIRF criticized Bangladesh for violence against minority Hindus. It also urged the Bush administration to get Dhaka to ensure the protection of religious freedom and minority rights before Bangladesh's next national elections in January 2007.

Sheikh Hasina era (2008–present) 
In 2013, the International Crimes Tribunal indicted several Jamaat members for war crimes against Hindus during the 1971 Bangladesh atrocities. In retaliation, violence against Hindu minorities in Bangladesh was instigated by the Bangladesh Jamaat-e-Islami.

BJHM (Bangladesh Jatiya Hinhu mahajote) claimed in its report that in 2017, at least 107 people of the Hindu community were killed and 31 fell victims to enforced disappearance 782 Hindus were either forced to leave the country or threatened to leave, and besides this, 23 were forced to get converted into other religions and at least 25 Hindu women and children were raped, while 235 temples and statues were vandalized during the year.
The total number of atrocities happened with the Hindu community in 2017 is 6474.

During the 2019 Bangladesh elections, eight houses belonging to Hindu families on fire in Thakurgaon alone. In April 2019, two idols of Hindu goddesses, Lakshmi and Saraswati, have been vandalized by unidentified miscreants at a newly constructed temple in Kazipara of Brahmanbaria. In the same month, several idols of Hindu gods in two temples in Madaripur Sadar Upazila which were under construction were desecrated by miscreants.

In 2021, many temples and houses of Hindus were broken and vandalized after an attack on them on Narendra Modi visit to Bangladesh by Hefazat-e-Islam and other radical groups as anti-Modi protests. Similarly, there were attacks on Hindus in 2020, after some of them supported France after the Murder of Samuel Paty. In the October of the same year there had been a severe communal violence in Bangladesh against the Bengali Hindus, after the video of Quran desecration at the Durga Puja pandals was spread in which more than 120 Hindu temples were vandalized and nearly 7 Hindus were killed. It was described by The New York Times as "worst communal violence in years".

Political representation
Even after the decline of the Hindu population in Bangladesh from 13.5% in 1974, just after the independence, Hindus were at around 11.2% of the population in 2001 according to government estimates following the census. However, Hindus accounted for only thirty two members of the 300 member parliament following the 2001 elections through direct election; this went up to thirty five following a by-election victory in 2004. Significantly, of the 50 seats reserved for women that are directly nominated by the Prime Minister, but only four was allotted to a Hindu. The political representation is not at all satisfactory and several Hindu advocacy groups in Bangladesh have demanded a return to a communal electorate system as existed during the Pakistan period, to enable a more equitable and proportionate representation in parliament, or a reserved quota since the persecution of Hindus has continued since 1946.

Despite their dwindling population in terms of overall percentage, Hindus still yield considerable influence because of their geographical concentration in certain regions. They form a majority of the electorate in at least two parliamentary constituencies (Khulna-1 and Gopalganj-3) and account for more than 25%  in at least another thirty. For this reason, they are often the deciding factor in parliamentary elections where victory margins can be extremely narrow. It is also frequently alleged that this is a prime reason for many Hindus being prevented from voting in elections, either through intimidating actual voters or through exclusion in voter list revisions.

Prominent Bangladeshi Hindus

See also

 Religion in Bangladesh
 Hinduism by country
 Bengali Hindus

References

Bibliography

External links

 
 
 
 

 
Bangladeshi Hindus
Hinduism and Islam
Religion in Bangladesh
Bangladesh
Bangladesh